Drew Sanders (born December 31, 2001) is an American football linebacker. He played college football at Alabama, where he was a member of the team that won the 2021 College Football Playoff National Championship, before transferring to Arkansas in 2022.

Early life and high school
Sanders grew up in Denton, Texas. He initially attended Lake Dallas High School, where his father was part of the school's coaching staff, and played linebacker and quarterback. As a freshman, Sanders passed for 392 yards and two touchdowns and also rushed for 438 yards and eight touchdowns. At the end of the school year, he transferred to Colleyville Heritage High School after his father was hired to a coaching position there. He committed to play college football at Oklahoma as a sophomore. Sanders transferred a second time after his sophomore year when his father was hired at Billy Ryan High School. He flipped his commitment from Oklahoma to Alabama during his junior year. Sanders was a 5-star recruit during his senior season, and ranked the #22 player in the country by 247Sports.

College career
Sanders played mostly on special teams during his freshman season and made nine tackles. As a sophomore, he became a starter in place of Christopher Allen following an injury. Sanders finished the season with 24 tackles, one sack, 2.5 tackles for a loss, and two passes defended. Following the end of the season, he entered the NCAA transfer portal.

Sanders ultimately transferred to Arkansas.

Sanders started at middle linebacker for Arkansas in all twelve games of the 2022 season, leading the team in tackles (103) and sacks (9.5). He was named to the 2022 College Football All-America Team and was a finalist for the Butkus Award. Sanders elected to forgo participation in the 2022 Liberty Bowl as well as his senior season to enter the 2023 NFL Draft. He is projected to be an early round pick.

References

External links
Arkansas Razorbacks bio
Alabama Crimson Tide bio

Living people
Players of American football from Texas
American football linebackers
Alabama Crimson Tide football players
Arkansas Razorbacks football players
2001 births